The Mosque of Idlib Sermin is a mosque located in Syria. It was damaged during the Syrian civil war.

See also 

 List of mosques in Syria
 List of heritage sites damaged during Syrian civil war

References 

Mosques in Syria